The Dark Eyes Of London is a crime novel by the British writer Edgar Wallace which was first published in 1924. An unbalanced doctor and his brother murder a series of wealthy men to benefit from their life insurance policies, using a charity for the blind as a front for their activities. The persistent Inspector Holt of Scotland Yard is soon on their trail. It was based on an earlier short story The Croakers which Wallace had written.

Adaptations
The novel has twice been adapted into films. The first was a British version directed by Walter Summers, The Dark Eyes of London (1939), which turned Wallace's crime story into a more overt horror film. Due to its popularity there, this was the inspiration for a similar German remake, The Dead Eyes of London (1961), directed by Alfred Vohrer.

Notes

References
 Richards, Jeffrey (ed.). The Unknown 1930s: An Alternative History of the British Cinema, 1929- 1939. I.B. Tauris & Co, 1998.

Further reading
 Lennig, Arthur. The Immortal Count: The Life and Films of Bela Lugosi. University Press of Kentucky, 2003.

External links
 

1924 British novels
British crime novels
British novels adapted into films
Novels by Edgar Wallace
Novels set in London